The Kosovo Maiden or Maiden of the Blackbird's Field ( / ) is the central figure of a poem with the same name, part of the Kosovo cycle in the Serbian epic poetry. In it, a young beauty searches the battlefield for her betrothed fiancé and helps wounded Serbian warriors with water, wine and bread after the Battle of Kosovo in 1389 between Serbia and the Ottoman Empire. She finally finds the wounded and dying warrior Pavle Orlović who tells her that her fiancé Milan Toplica and his blood-brothers Miloš Obilić and Ivan Kosančić are dead. Before the battle they had given her a cloak, golden ring and veil for the wedding as a promise of safe return, but they were slain and Pavle pointed to the direction of the bodies. The poem finishes with; "O wretch! Evil is your fortune!If I, a wretch, were to grasp a green pine,Even the green pine would wither."

The poem became very popular as a symbol of womanly compassion and charity. Serbian painter Uroš Predić took up the theme in 1919 with an oil painting of the same title. In 1907, Croatian sculptor Ivan Meštrović created a marble relief of the subject as a part of his Kosovo cycle. Another Croatian artist, painter Mirko Rački, painted a version of Kosovo Maiden.

See also
Mother Serbia
National personification

External links
The Maiden of Kossovo, Songs from Kosovo cycle

Serbian culture
Serbian literature
National personifications
National symbols of Serbia
Characters in Serbian epic poetry
Serb culture
Cultural depictions of Serbian women
Feminism in Serbia